The 2019–20 Taipei Fubon Braves season was the first season of the franchise in the ASEAN Basketball League (ABL), its 6th in the Taipei City and playing home games at Taipei Heping Basketball Gymnasium. They are coached by Hsu Chin-Che in his third year as head coach.

Standings

Roster

Game log

FIBA Asia Champions Cup

East Asia Qualifiers

Group Phase

Regular season

Player Statistics 
<noinclude>

Regular season

Transactions

Free Agency

Re-signed

Additions

Subtractions

Awards

Players of the Month

Players of the Week

References 

Taipei Fubon Braves seasons
2019–20 ABL season